Zsuzsa Szloboda (born 5 December 1954) is a Hungarian volleyball player. She competed in the women's tournament at the 1976 Summer Olympics.

References

External links
 

1954 births
Living people
Hungarian women's volleyball players
Olympic volleyball players of Hungary
Volleyball players at the 1976 Summer Olympics
People from Ózd
Sportspeople from Borsod-Abaúj-Zemplén County